The Piper PA-12 Super Cruiser is an American three-seat, high wing, single-engine conventional landing gear-equipped light aircraft that was produced by Piper Aircraft between 1946-48. The PA-12 was an upgraded and redesignated Piper J-5.

Development
When Piper dropped the J- designation system in exchange for the PA- system, the J-5C became the PA-12 "Super Cruiser". The earlier J-5s had been powered by either a  Lycoming O-235 or a  Lycoming O-145. The newer PA-12 model was initially powered by a  Lycoming O-235-C engine, was fully cowled, and had a metal spar wing with two 19 gallon fuel tanks.

The prototype NX41561 was converted from a J-5C and first flew from Lock Haven, Pennsylvania, on 29 October 1945. The first production model followed on 22 February 1946 and quantity production continued until the last example of 3760 built was completed on 18 March 1948.

The PA-12 is approved for wheels, skis, floats and also for crop spraying.

Cockpit accommodation is provided for the pilot in the front seat and two passengers in the rear seat, side-by-side. Unlike the J-3 Cub the PA-12 is flown solo from the front seat.

Operational use

Many PA-12s have been modified with larger engines. Wing flaps and a metal-skin fuselage can be added as modifications.

In 1947, two PA-12s, named City of Washington and City of the Angels, flew around the world. The worst mechanical failure they suffered was a cracked tailwheel. The City of Washington currently resides at the Boeing Aviation Hangar, part of the  Steven F. Udvar-Hazy Center in Chantilly, Virginia.  The City of the Angels is on display at the Piper Aviation Museum in Lock Haven, Pennsylvania.

PA-12s have been exported to a number of countries including Belgium, Canada, France, Ireland, Netherlands, Switzerland and the United Kingdom. Many PA-12s are still flown by private pilot owners and the type is commonly seen in North America. In November 2009 there were still 1688 registered in the US and 229 in Canada.

Variants
PA-12
PA-12S
Second model type certified 11 August 1948, with  gross weight, Normal Category only The PA-12S Seaplane variant was fitted with the  Lycoming O-290-D2 engine to improve take-off performance.

Notable accidents
 31 July 2020 - A PA-12 piloted by Alaska State Representative Gary Knopp was involved in a mid-air collision with a de Havilland Canada DHC-2 Beaver near Soldotna Airport in the Kenai Peninsula, killing Knopp and all six persons aboard the DHC-2.

Specifications (PA-12)

See also

References

Bibliography
 
 Peperell, Roger W. and Smith Colin R., Piper Aircraft and their forerunners, 1987, Air-Britain (Historians) Ltd, Tonbridge, Kent, .

External links

PA-12
Single-engined tractor aircraft
1940s United States civil utility aircraft
High-wing aircraft
Aircraft first flown in 1945